The American Morgan Horse Association (AMHA) is the largest equine registry dedicated to the Morgan horse. It was located in Shelburne, Vermont until 2019 when it relocated to Lexington, Kentucky. The AMHA was founded in 1909.

History
The American Morgan Horse Association was originally formed in 1909 as the Morgan Horse Club. Since then, it has grown to include about 7,000 active members and 100,000 living horses.

Registry
Only purebred Morgan horses with two registered parents can be registered with the AMHA; half Morgans cannot be registered. Horses already registered with the British Morgan Horse Society, Swedish Morgan Horse Association, or Canadian Morgan Horse Association are eligible for AMHA registration. 
Cloned horses may not be registered with the AMHA, but foals resulting from embryo transfer may be.

Competition
Morgan horses registered with the AMHA are eligible to compete in events sanctioned by the United States Equestrian Federation, which holds all purebred Morgan shows. The AMHA also partners with the American Horse Council, the American Driving Society, the United States Dressage Federation, and the Western Dressage Association of America. There are ten sanctioned regional shows held annually, and the largest Morgan horse show, the Grand National and World Championship Morgan Horse Show, is held annually in Oklahoma City.

References

External links
Official Website
Horse Pictures

Horse breed registries
Morgan horses